

This is a list of the National Register of Historic Places designations in Hartford County, Connecticut.

This is intended to be a complete list of the properties and districts on the National Register of Historic Places in Hartford County, Connecticut, United States. The locations of National Register properties and districts for which the latitude and longitude coordinates are included below, may be seen in various online maps.

There are 436 properties and districts listed on the National Register in the county, including 21 National Historic Landmarks. More than half of these listings are in the city of Hartford (141) and the towns of Windsor (41), Southington (41) and West Hartford (32). They are listed separately, while the 190 properties and districts in the remaining parts of the county are listed below. Four properties and districts extend into Hartford, Southington and/or New Haven County and appear in more than one list.

Current listings

Hartford

Southington

West Hartford

Windsor

Other cities and towns

|}

Former listings

|}

See also

List of National Historic Landmarks in Connecticut
National Register of Historic Places listings in Connecticut

References

 
 
Hartford